COVID-19 apps, including mobile-software applications on iOS and Android for digital contact-tracing:

 Aarogya Setu
 BlueTrace
 careFIJI
 Coronavirus Australia
 Corona-Warn-App
 COVID-19 Contact-Confirming Application
 COVID Alert (Canada)
 COVID AlertSA (South Africa)
 COVIDSafe
 COVID Symptom Study
 COVID Tracker Ireland
 Covid Watch
 Decentralized Privacy-Preserving Proximity Tracing
 Exposure Notification
 Health Code
 Healthy Together
 Immuni
 Koronavilkku
 LeaveHomeSafe
 MySejahtera
 NHS COVID-19
 NZ COVID Tracer
 NZ Pass Verifier
 PathCheck
 PeduliLindungi
 SafeEntry
 SafePass
 StaySafe.ph
 SwissCovid
 TCN Protocol
 Test, Trace, Protect
 Thai Chana
 TousAntiCovid
 TraceTogether
 Valtrace

Mobile applications
Software associated with the COVID-19 pandemic